Steenbecque is a commune in the Nord department in northern France.

Etymology
Steenbecque has historically been attested as Steenbeka in 1183. The toponym Steenbecque is of Germanic origin, deriving from a Low German dialect, ultimately from Proto-West-Germanic *stain. Within the Nord and Pas-de-Calais departments, the Germanic hydronym *-bak(i) entered the French language via Low German, and took on two forms: the Germanic form -beek and Romance -becque (also -bec, -becques).

Heraldry

See also
Communes of the Nord department

References

Communes of Nord (French department)
French Flanders